The 1913–14 Welsh Amateur Cup was the 24th season of the Welsh Amateur Cup. The cup was won by Cardiff Corinthians who defeated Holywell 1-0 in the final at Newtown, and in doing so became the first team from South Wales to win the Cup.

Second round

Third round

Fourth round

Semi-final

Final

References

1913-14
Welsh Cup
1913–14 domestic association football cups